László Sombori (Sombory; ? – September 1590) was a Hungarian noble in the Principality of Transylvania, member of the Royal Council, who served as Governor of Transylvania for the underage voivode Sigismund Báthory (along with Sándor Kendi and Farkas Kovacsóczy) from 6 March 1583 to 1 May 1585.

References

Sources
 Markó, László: A magyar állam főméltóságai Szent Istvántól napjainkig – Életrajzi Lexikon pp. 123–124.  (The High Officers of the Hungarian State from Saint Stephen to the Present Days – A Biographical Encyclopedia) (2nd edition); Helikon Kiadó Kft., 2006, Budapest; .

1590 deaths
Hungarian nobility in Transylvania
Hungarian politicians
Year of birth unknown